Prasert Thongcharoen (ศาสตราจารย์เกียรติคุณ นายแพทย์ ประเสริฐ ทองเจริญ) (2 January 1933 - 9 July 2019) was a Thai virologist, specialised in the fields of SARS, HIV, Bird Flu and many other diseases. Graduated from Bernhard Nocht Institute for Tropical Medicine Hamburg and University of Hamburg, he then started researching on virus diseases straight after his graduation, and today, he continues to research in a field which he specialises in. He was also the Director of WHO Collaborating Centre on AIDS and Member of the WHO Expert Committee Advisory Panel on Virus Diseases.

References

Prasert Thongcharoen
1933 births
2019 deaths
Prasert Thongcharoen
University of Hamburg alumni